Hello, Dolly! is a 1964 musical with lyrics and music by Jerry Herman and a book by Michael Stewart, based on Thornton Wilder's 1938 farce The Merchant of Yonkers, which Wilder revised and retitled The Matchmaker in 1955. The musical follows the story of Dolly Gallagher Levi, a strong-willed matchmaker, as she travels to Yonkers, New York, to find a match for the miserly "well-known unmarried half-a-millionaire" Horace Vandergelder.

Hello, Dolly! debuted at the Fisher Theater in Detroit on November 18, 1963, directed and choreographed by Gower Champion and produced by David Merrick, and moved to Broadway in 1964, winning 10 Tony Awards, including Best Musical. These awards set a record which the play held for 37 years. The show album Hello, Dolly! An Original Cast Recording was inducted into the Grammy Hall of Fame in 2002. The album reached number one on the Billboard album chart on June 6, 1964, and was replaced the next week by Louis Armstrong's album Hello, Dolly! Louis Armstrong also was featured in the film version of the show, performing a small part of the song "Hello, Dolly!".

The show has become one of the most enduring musical theater hits, with four Broadway revivals and international success. It was also made into the 1969 film Hello Dolly! by 20th Century Fox, which won three Academy Awards, including Best Score of a Musical Picture and was nominated in four other categories, including Best Picture at the 42nd Academy Awards.

History
The plot of Hello, Dolly! originated in the 1835 English play A Day Well Spent by John Oxenford, which Johann Nestroy adapted into the farce Einen Jux will er sich machen (He Will Go on a Spree or He'll Have Himself a Good Time) in 1842. Thornton Wilder adapted Nestroy's play into his 1938 farcical play The Merchant of Yonkers. That play was a flop, so he revised it and retitled it as The Matchmaker in 1954, expanding the role of Dolly (played by Ruth Gordon).  The Matchmaker became a hit and was much revived and made into a 1958 film starring Shirley Booth. 

The role of Dolly Gallagher Levi was originally written for Ethel Merman but she turned it down, as did Mary Martin—although both eventually played it. Merrick then auditioned Nancy Walker, but he hired Carol Channing who originated the role of Dolly. Director Gower Champion was not the producer's first choice, but Hal Prince and others turned it down, among them Jerome Robbins and Joe Layton.

Hello, Dolly! had rocky tryouts in Detroit, Michigan and Washington, D.C. After receiving the reviews, the creators made major changes to the script and score, including the addition of the song "Before the Parade Passes By". The show was originally entitled Dolly, A Damned Exasperating Woman, then Call on Dolly, but Merrick changed it upon hearing Louis Armstrong's version of "Hello, Dolly".  The show became one of the most iconic Broadway shows of the latter half of the 1960s, and running for 2,844 performances, was the longest-running musical in Broadway history for a time.

Synopsis

Sources: Tams-Witmark Guide to Musical Theatre Masterworks Broadway<ref>[http://www.masterworksbroadway.com/music/hello-dolly-1967-broadway-cast/ Hello, Dolly!"] masterworksbroadway.com, accessed December 20, 2016</ref>

Act I

As the 19th becomes the 20th century, all of New York City is excited because widowed but brassy Dolly Gallagher Levi is in town ("Call on Dolly"). Dolly makes a living through what she calls "meddling" – matchmaking and numerous sidelines, including dance instruction and mandolin lessons ("I Put My Hand In").  She is currently seeking a wife for grumpy Horace Vandergelder, the well-known half-a-millionaire, but it becomes clear that Dolly intends to marry Horace herself.  Ambrose Kemper, a young artist, wants to marry Horace's weepy niece Ermengarde, but Horace opposes this because Ambrose's vocation does not guarantee a steady living.  Ambrose enlists Dolly's help, and they travel to Yonkers, New York to visit Horace, who is a prominent citizen there and owns Vandergelder's Hay and Feed.

Horace explains to his two clerks, Cornelius Hackl and Barnaby Tucker, that he is going to get married because "It Takes a Woman" to cheerfully do all the household chores.  He plans to travel with Dolly to New York City to march in the Fourteenth Street Association Parade and propose to the widow Irene Molloy, who owns a hat shop there.  Dolly arrives in Yonkers and "accidentally" mentions that Irene's first husband might not have died of natural causes, and also mentions that she knows an heiress, Ernestina Money, who may be interested in Horace.  Horace leaves for New York and leaves Cornelius and Barnaby to run the store.

Cornelius decides that he and Barnaby need to get out of Yonkers.  They'll go to New York, have a good meal, spend all their money, see the stuffed whale in Barnum's museum, almost get arrested, and each kiss a girl!  They blow up some tomato cans to create a terrible stench as a pretext to close the store.  Dolly mentions that she knows two ladies in New York they should call on: Irene Molloy and her shop assistant, Minnie Fay.  She tells Ermengarde and Ambrose that she'll enter them in the polka competition at the upscale Harmonia Gardens Restaurant in New York City so Ambrose can demonstrate his ability to be a breadwinner to Horace.  Cornelius, Barnaby, Ambrose, Ermengarde and Dolly all take the train to New York ("Put on Your Sunday Clothes").

Irene and Minnie open their hat shop for the afternoon.  Irene wants a husband, but does not love Horace Vandergelder.  She declares that she will wear an elaborate hat to impress a gentleman ("Ribbons Down My Back").  Cornelius and Barnaby arrive at the shop and pretend to be rich.  Horace and Dolly arrive at the shop, and Cornelius and Barnaby hide from him.  Irene inadvertently mentions that she knows Cornelius Hackl, and Dolly tells her and Horace that even though Cornelius is Horace's clerk by day, he's a New York playboy by night; he's one of the Hackls.  Minnie screams when she finds Cornelius hiding in the armoire.  Horace is about to open the armoire himself, but Dolly, Irene and Minnie distract him with patriotic sentiments related to subjects like Betsy Ross and The Battle of the Alamo shown in the famous lyrics "Alamo, remember the Alamo!" ("Motherhood March"). Cornelius sneezes, and Horace storms out, realizing there are men hiding in the shop, but not knowing they are his clerks.

Dolly arranges for Cornelius and Barnaby, who are still pretending to be rich, to take the ladies out to dinner to the Harmonia Gardens restaurant to make up for their humiliation.  She teaches Cornelius and Barnaby how to dance since they always have dancing at such establishments ("Dancing").  Soon, Cornelius, Irene, Barnaby, and Minnie are happily dancing.  They go to watch the great 14th Street Association Parade together.  Alone, Dolly decides to put her dear departed husband Ephram behind her and to move on with life "Before the Parade Passes By".  She asks Ephram's permission to marry Horace, requesting a sign from him.  Dolly catches up with the annoyed Vandergelder, who has missed the whole parade, and she convinces him to give her matchmaking one more chance.  She tells him that Ernestina Money would be perfect for him and asks him to meet her at the swanky Harmonia Gardens that evening.

Act II

Cornelius is determined to get a kiss before the night is over, but Barnaby isn't so sure.  As the clerks have no money for a carriage, they tell the girls that walking to the restaurant shows that they've got "Elegance".  At the Harmonia Gardens Restaurant, Rudolph, the head waiter, prepares his service crew for Dolly Gallagher Levi's return: their usual lightning service, he tells them, must be "twice as lightning" ("The Waiters' Gallop").  Horace arrives with his date, but she proves neither as rich nor as elegant as Dolly had implied; furthermore she is soon bored by Horace and leaves, as Dolly had planned she would.

Cornelius, Barnaby, and their dates arrive, unaware that Horace is also dining at the restaurant.  Irene and Minnie, inspired by the restaurant's opulence, order the menu's most expensive items. Cornelius and Barnaby grow increasingly anxious as they discover they have little more than a dollar left. Dolly makes her triumphant return to the Harmonia Gardens and is greeted in style by the staff ("Hello, Dolly!") She sits in the now-empty seat at Horace's table and proceeds to eat a large, expensive dinner, telling the exasperated Horace that no matter what he says, she will not marry him. Barnaby and Horace hail waiters at the same time, and in the ensuing confusion each drops his wallet and inadvertently picks up the other's. Barnaby is delighted that he can now pay the restaurant bill, while Horace finds only a little spare change.  Barnaby and Cornelius realize that the wallet must belong to Horace. Cornelius, Irene, Barnaby and Minnie try to sneak out during "The Polka Contest", but Horace recognizes them and spots Ermengarde and Ambrose as well. The ensuing free-for-all culminates in a trip to night court.

Cornelius and Barnaby confess that they have no money and have never been to New York before. Cornelius declares that even if he has to dig ditches the rest of his life, he'll never forget the day because he had met Irene. Cornelius, Barnaby, and Ambrose then each profess their love for their companion ("It Only Takes A Moment"). Dolly convinces the judge that their only crime was being in love. The judge finds everyone innocent and cleared of all charges, but Horace is declared guilty and forced to pay damages. Dolly mentions marriage again, and Horace declares that he wouldn't marry her if she were the last woman in the world.  Dolly angrily bids him "So Long, Dearie", telling him that while he's bored and lonely, she'll be living the high life.

The next morning, back at the hay and feed store, Cornelius and Irene, Barnaby and Minnie, and Ambrose and Ermengarde each set out on new life's paths.  A chastened Horace Vandergelder finally admits that he needs Dolly in his life, but Dolly is unsure about the marriage until her late husband sends her a sign.  Vandergelder spontaneously repeats a saying of Ephram's: "Money is like manure. It's not worth a thing unless it's spread about, encouraging young things to grow."  Horace tells Dolly life would be dull without her, and she promises in return that she'll "never go away again" ("Hello, Dolly" (reprise)).

Characters
 Dolly Gallagher Levi: A widow in her middle years who has decided to begin her life again. She is a matchmaker, meddler, opportunist, and a life-loving woman.
 Horace Vandergelder: The proprietor of a Hay & Feed store and a client of Dolly Gallagher Levi's. A well-known half-a-millionaire and widower, he is gruff, authoritative, and set in his ways.
 Cornelius Hackl: Vandergelder's chief clerk who yearns for one exciting day in New York City. Energetic, enthusiastic, and adventurous young man who has a sweet innocence about him.
 Barnaby Tucker: An assistant to Cornelius at Vandergelder's Hay & Feed store.  He is sweet, naïve, energetic, and a follower.
 Irene Molloy: A widow and a beautiful, smart, fun-loving milliner with a hat shop in New York City.  Dolly has introduced her to Horace Vandergelder but she yearns for romance.
 Minnie Fay: A young girl who works in Irene's hat shop.  Irene's assistant, she is naïve, strait-laced, fresh, and a follower.
 Ambrose Kemper: A young and explosive struggling artist seeking to marry Ermengarde.
 Ermengarde: The young niece of Horace Vandergelder. She cries often and wants her independence and to marry Ambrose.
 Ernestina Money: An eccentric-looking girl in need of Dolly's matchmaker services.
 Rudolf Reisenweber: Maître d' of the Harmonia Gardens restaurant.
 Judge: A white-whiskered night court judge. Easily moved to tears by romance.
 Mrs. Rose: An old friend of Dolly's.

Characters and original cast

Broadway cast replacements
Broadway 1964

Dolly Gallagher Levi: Pearl Bailey (November 12, 1967), Marie Bryant (standby), Thelma Carpenter (alternate from February 1969; temporary replacement for Bailey from September 8 to October 8, 1969), Ethel Merman (March 28, 1970), Novella Nelson (understudy), Phyllis Diller (December 26, 1969), Bibi Osterwald (November 6, 1967), Betty Grable (June 12, 1967), Martha Raye (February 27, 1967), Ginger Rogers (August 9, 1965) 
Horace Vandergelder: Cab Calloway (November 12, 1967), Richard Deacon, Max Showalter (March 13, 1967)
Cornelius Hackl: Will Mackenzie, Russell Nype (March 28, 1970)
Barnaby Tucker: Danny Lockin (Barnaby from the 1969 film)
Irene Molloy: Ernestine Jackson
Minnie Fay: Georgia Engel (December 26, 1969), Leland Palmer (June 30, 1967)
Ernestina: Mabel King (November 12, 1967)

Broadway 2017

Dolly Gallagher Levi: Bernadette Peters"Hello, Dolly! Replacements 2017–2018" ibdb.com, accessed September 6, 2019Stasio, Marilyn. "Broadway Review: Bernadette Peters in ‘Hello, Dolly!’" Variety, February 22, 2018
Dolly Gallagher Levi: Donna Murphy (alternate at certain performances only)McPhee, Ryan. "Read Reviews for Donna Murphy in Hello, Dolly!" Playbill, July 10, 2017
Horace Vandergelder: Victor Garber
Cornelius Hackl: Santino Fontana
Barnaby Tucker: Charlie Stemp
Ernestina: Alli MauzeyMcPhee. "Alli Mauzey Joins Broadway’s Hello, Dolly!" Playbill, March 19, 2018

Notable 2019 U.S. Tour replacements
Dolly Gallagher Levi: Carolee Carmello"Carolee-Carmello-Walks-the-Passerelle" Playbill, September 25, 2019
Horace Vandergelder: John Bolton

Musical numbers

Act I
 Overture – Orchestra
 "Call On Dolly" – Ensemble
 "I Put My Hand In" — Dolly
 "It Takes a Woman" — Horace, Men
 "It Takes a Woman(Reprise)" – Dolly
 "World, Take Me Back" – Dolly*
 "Put On Your Sunday Clothes" — Cornelius, Barnaby, Dolly, Ambrose, Ermengarde, and Ensemble
 "Ribbons Down My Back" — Irene
 "Ribbons Down My Back (Reprise)" – Irene
 "Motherhood March”— Dolly, Irene, and Minnie Fay
 "Dancing" — Dolly, Cornelius, Barnaby, Irene, Minnie Fay, and Ensemble
 "Love, Look in My Window" – Dolly*
 "Before the Parade Passes By" — Dolly and the Company**
 "Finale Act I: Before the Parade Passes By" – Dolly

Act II
 Entr'acte – Orchestra
 "Penny in My Pocket" – Vandergelder^ 
 "Elegance" – Cornelius, Barnaby, Irene, and Minnie Fay
 "The Waiters' Gallop" – Rudolph and the Waiters
 "Hello, Dolly!" – Dolly, Rudolph, Waiters, Cooks
 "The Waiters' Gallop (Reprise)" – Rudolph and Waiters
 "The Polka Contest" – Ambrose, Ermengarde, Irene, Cornelius, Minnie Fay, Barnaby, and the Contestants***
 "It Only Takes a Moment" – Cornelius, Irene, Ensemble
 "So Long Dearie" – Dolly
 "Hello, Dolly!" (Reprise) – Dolly and Vandergelder
 "Finale Act II: Hello, Dolly! / Dancing / It Only Takes a Moment / Put On Your Sunday Clothes / Hello, Dolly!" — The Company

*Song cut before Broadway Opening, reinstated when Ethel Merman joined to play Dolly.
**Song was not included in the original version. During the tryouts in Detroit, Gower Champion invited Charles Strouse and Lee Adams to consult on improvements to the musical. David Merrick was aware of their involvement, but Jerry Herman was not, even though Strouse was under impression that Herman knew about it. Strouse and Adams suggested re-working the ending of Act I, wrote a new song "Before the Parade Passes By" and sent it to Champion. By the time the next set of tryouts in Washington began, a different number with the same name, written by Herman, was included in the show. After Strouse and Adams threatened to sue the production, they were given a songwriting credit for the song. That conflict led to an eight-year-long feud between Gower and Michael Stewart on one side and Strouse and Adams on the other. The official songwriting credits as listed with ASCAP have Adams, Herman and Strouse as co-writers.
***Song replaced "Come and Be My Butterfly" during Broadway Run.

^Horace Vandergelder's solo "Penny in My Pocket", although it received rave responses out of town, was cut prior to the Broadway opening for reasons of time. For the 2017 Broadway Revival, it was added back in as the opening of Act Two in front of the curtain. It is not, however, included in the licensed version for stock and amateur productions from Tams Witmark.

The song "Elegance", though credited to Herman, was written by Bob Merrill for the 1957 show New Girl in Town but deleted from the original production.

Productions

Original Broadway production
The musical, directed and choreographed by Gower Champion and produced by David Merrick, opened on January 16, 1964, at the St. James Theatre and closed on December 27, 1970, after 2,844 performances. Carol Channing starred as Dolly, with a supporting cast that included David Burns as Horace, Charles Nelson Reilly as Cornelius, Eileen Brennan as Irene, Jerry Dodge as Barnaby, Sondra Lee as Minnie Fay, Mary Jo Catlett as Ermengarde, and Igors Gavon as Ambrose.  Although facing competition from Funny Girl with Barbra Streisand, Hello, Dolly! swept the Tony Awards in 1964, winning awards in ten categories (out of eleven nominations) that tied the musical with the previous record keeper South Pacific, record that remained unbroken for 37 years until The Producers won twelve Tonys in 2001.

After Channing left the show, Merrick employed prominent actresses to play Dolly, including Ginger Rogers, who started on August 9, 1965; Martha Raye, starting on February 27, 1967; Betty Grable, from June 12, 1967, to November 5, 1967; Pearl Bailey (in an all-black version with Cab Calloway as Horace) starting on November 12, 1967 (with Thelma Carpenter as her alternate); Phyllis Diller, as of December 26, 1969; and Ethel Merman (after having turned down the lead at the show's inception) from March 28, 1970, to December 27, 1970.

Two songs cut prior to the opening – typical belt style songs "World, Take Me Back" and "Love, Look in My Window" – were restored for Merman's run. Jo Anne Worley was Channing's original standby but she never went on. She later played Dolly in regional and summer stock productions. Bibi Osterwald was the standby for Dolly following Worley's and Channings' departures, subbing for all the stars, including Bailey, despite the fact that Osterwald was white. Marie Bryant and Novella Nelson also covered for the role of Dolly. Bailey received a Special Tony Award in 1968.

The show received rave reviews,Bovson article with "praise for Carol Channing and particularly Gower Champion." The original production became the longest-running musical (and third longest-running show) in Broadway history up to that time, surpassing My Fair Lady and then being surpassed in turn by Fiddler on the Roof.  The Broadway production of Hello Dolly! grossed $27 million. Hello, Dolly! and Fiddler remained the longest-running Broadway record holders for nearly ten years until Grease surpassed them.

Tour and regional Dollys
Carole Cook, (the second actress to play the title role, after Channing, appearing in Australia and New Zealand productions), Dorothy Lamour, Eve Arden, Ann Miller, Michele Lee, Edie Adams, and Yvonne De Carlo played the role on tour. Betty White appeared with the Kenley Players as Dolly in the summer of 1979. Molly Picon appeared as Dolly in a 1971 production by the North Shore Music Theatre of Beverly, Massachusetts. Lainie Kazan starred in a production at the Claridge Atlantic City. Vicki Lawrence played the role twice, once for Sacramento Music Circus and once for Glendale Music Theatre. Both Tovah Feldshuh and Betsy Palmer played Dolly in productions by the Paper Mill Playhouse. Marilyn Maye also starred in several regional productions and recorded a full album of the score. Sally Struthers led a U.S. tour in 2014.

 Original Australian production 
The Australian production was produced by J. C. Williamson Theatres Ltd. and opened at Her Majesty's Theatre, Sydney on 27 March 1965. Carole Cook was imported to star, making her the second woman to play the role of Dolly Levi. Jack Goode played Horace, alongside Bill Millican as Cornelius, Jill Perryman as Irene, Tikki Taylor as Minnie Fay, and Brian Hannan as Barnaby.

Australian choreographer Betty Pounder was employed to stage the musical numbers. Jill Perryman served as understudy to Carole Cook. Nancye Hayes was featured in the ensemble as well as understudying the part of Irene Molloy.

After a successful season in Sydney, the show went on to play Her Majesty's Theatre, Melbourne, and His Majesty's Theatre, Auckland in 1966." 'Hello, Dolly!' Australia" ovrtur.com, accessed September 24, 2016 Australian revivals 
In 1995 a new Australian tour was presented by Gordon Frost. Jill Perryman, who starred as Irene Molloy in the 1965 production, starred as Dolly Levi. The production opened at the State Theatre, Melbourne, followed by Lyric Theatre, Brisbane, Her Majesty's Theatre, Sydney, Festival Theatre, Adelaide and His Majesty's Theatre, Perth.

The Production Company has staged Hello, Dolly! at the State Theatre, Melbourne twice: first in 2002, starring Amanda Muggleton, then again in 2017, starring Marina Prior.

Original London productionHello, Dolly! premiered in the West End at the Theatre Royal Drury Lane on December 2, 1965, and ran for 794 performances. Champion directed and choreographed, and the cast starred Mary Martin as Dolly (after she, as well as Merman, had turned down the role for the original run of the show) and Loring Smith as Horace Vandergelder. Smith had created the Horace role in the original Broadway production of The Matchmaker, Johnny Beecher as Barnaby, Garrett Lewis as Cornelius, Mark Alden as Ambrose Kemper, and Marilynn Lovell as Irene Molloy. Dora Bryan replaced Martin from May 1966 until the show closed in October 1967.

Revivals
The show has been revived four times on Broadway:
November 6, 1975 – December 28, 1975, Minskoff Theatre – Starring Pearl Bailey and Billy Daniels in an all-black production (42 performances)
March 5, 1978 – July 9, 1978, Lunt-Fontanne Theatre – Starring Carol Channing and Eddie Bracken (147 performances)
October 19, 1995 – January 28, 1996, Lunt-Fontanne Theatre – Starring Carol Channing and Jay Garner (116 performances)
April 20, 2017 – August 25, 2018, Shubert Theatre – Starring Bette Midler and David Hyde Pierce (550 performances)

In the West End the show has been revived three times (to date, November 2019):
1979 – Starring Carol Channing at the Theatre Royal, Drury Lane and Shaftesbury Theatre
January 3, 1984 – April 27, 1984 – Starring female impersonator Danny La Rue as Dolly at the Prince of Wales Theatre
July 30, 2009 – September 12, 2009 – Starring Samantha Spiro (Dolly) and Allan Corduner (Horace) at the Open Air Theatre, Regent's Park. Spiro won the Olivier Award for her performance.

In 1989, there was a UK tour of the show directed and choreographed by Paul Kerryson, starring Dora Bryan. Kerryson went on to direct the show again in 2014 at the Curve Theatre in Leicester UK, starring Janie Dee.

On 22 November 2019, it was announced that a new production would run for a limited season at the Adelphi Theatre starring Imelda Staunton, Jenna Russell and Andy Nyman from 11 August 2020, with direction by Dominic Cooke. Due to the COVID-19 pandemic, the show has been postponed until 2022.

2017 Broadway revival/national tour

On January 19, 2016, it was announced that Bette Midler would play the title role in a Broadway revival of Hello, Dolly!. Previews began March 15, 2017, officially opening on April 20, 2017, at the Shubert Theatre.McPhee, Ryan. "Get a First Look at Bette Midler in Hello, Dolly! Playbill, March 14, 2017

The production was produced by Scott Rudin, directed by Jerry Zaks and choreographed by Warren Carlyle. David Hyde Pierce played Horace Vandergelder. Other principal casting for this revival included Kate Baldwin as Irene Molloy, Gavin Creel as Cornelius Hackl, Jennifer Simard as Ernestina Money, Taylor Trensch as Barnaby Tucker, Will Burton as Ambrose Kemper, Melanie Moore as Ermengarde, and Beanie Feldstein as Minnie Fay. Donna Murphy played the role of Dolly at Tuesday evening performances beginning in June 2017, as well as covering Midler's holiday dates. She played her final performance on January 7, 2018. Midler won the Tony for Best Actress in a Leading Role in a Musical, and Creel for Best Actor in a Featured Role in a Musical, at the 71st Tony Awards in 2017. 

Midler, Pierce, Trensch, and Feldstein left the production on January 14, 2018. Bernadette Peters took over the role of Dolly with previews from January 20, 2018, officially on February 22, 2018, and Victor Garber took over the role of Horace Vandergelder. Charlie Stemp assumed the role of Barnaby Tucker on January 20, 2018.Green, Jesse. " Theater. Hello Dolly Review" The New York Times, February 22, 2018 Santino Fontana temporarily played the role of Cornelius Hackl from March 2018 to May 6 while Gavin Creel recovered from back surgery. Creel returned to the role on May 8, 2018. Before Fontana's temporary engagement, understudy Christian Dante White played the role of Cornelius. The production closed on August 25, 2018, with Midler and Hyde Pierce returning to play Dolly and Horace (respectively) from July 17, 2018, to closing.

Betty Buckley played the title role in the first national tour of the 2017 Broadway revival, which began performances in Cleveland, Ohio in October 2018 in the Connor Palace at Playhouse Square, after a tryout in Utica, New York in September 2018.McPhee, Ryan. : Hello, Dolly! National Tour, Starring Betty Buckley, Begins September 25" Playbill, September 25, 2018

International productions
The Israeli production in 1968–1970 starred Hanna Maron as Dolly Levi, one of the most famous actress on the Israel theater, on the "Alhambra" theater, produced by Giora Godik, also starring Shraga Friedman as Horace Vandergelder, Gadi Yagil as Cornelius Hackl and Tzipi Shavit as Minnie Fay. The musical was a huge success and Dolly remains one of Maron's lovable roles. The musical was translated to Hebrew by Haim Hefer, a well-known songwriter and poet.
In 1967, the Argentine singer and actress Libertad Lamarque starred the first Spanish language version of the musical in the Teatro Manolo Fabregas of Mexico City. Lamarque also starred the musical in Argentina the same year.
In 1985, Cuban diva Rosita Fornés played Dolly in a Cuban production of Hello, Dolly by the Teatro Karl Marx in Havana, Cuba. She also played the role in Camaguey City and in a television production under director Manolo Rifat.
In 1989, Canadian theatre actress Nonnie Griffin played Dolly in a 10-month run of Hello Dolly in Toronto.
In 1996, Mexican cinema star Silvia Pinal starred in a new version of the musical opposite Ignacio Lopez Tarso in the Teatro Silvia Pinal, in Mexico City.
 In 2018, the Mexican actress and singer Daniela Romo starred in a new Mexican version of the musical in the Teatro de los Insurgentes in Mexico City.
 In 2020, Lucía Galán (half of the Pimpinela singing duo) starred in the Argentinian version of the musical in the Teatro Opera in Buenos Aires.

Tours
Mary Martin starred in a US tour, starting in April 1965 and playing in 11 cities. The production also toured in Japan, Korea and Vietnam for a special USO performance for U.S. troops.Dibble, Susan. "From the S&S archives: Mary Martin, 'Dolly!' cast in Tokyo" Stars and Stripes, September 8, 1965
A second US tour began in September 1965, headed by Channing, and ran for two years and nine months. Eve Arden and Dorothy Lamour were replacements.
Bailey and Calloway headed an all-Black tour in 1967 prior to their Broadway run, which was given a second cast album.
In 2008, Anita Dobson toured in the UK.
Sally Struthers appeared as Dolly in the 50th anniversary tour of the musical, starting in October 2013.
A tour of the 2017 Broadway revival began touring the U.S. in September 2018 in Utica, New York starring Betty Buckley. The cast includes Lewis J. Stadlen as Horace Vandergelder, Nic Rouleau as Cornelius, Analisa Leaning as Irene Molloy, Jess LeProtto as Barnaby, Kristen Hahn as Minnie Fay, Garret Hawe as Ambrose Kemper, Morgan Kirner as Ermengarde, and Jessica Sheridan as Ernestina. Buckley ended her run in the tour on August 25, 2019; Carolee Carmello took over as Dolly on September 24, 2019, in Kansas City, Missouri. The other cast changes effective in September 2019 include John Bolton as Horace, with new cast playing Cornelius, Barnaby, Minnie Fay, and Ambrose. The tour's last stop was in Rochester, NY in March 2020.

Critical reception
Opening night reviews of the original production were generally positive, and Carol Channing's performance as Dolly Gallagher Levi was greatly acclaimed; however, some reviewers criticized the score and the libretto, implying that Channing's performance was responsible for the efficacy of the show. In his review of the opening night performance, The New York Times theatre critic Howard Taubman wrote

Hello, Dolly! ... has qualities of freshness and imagination that are rare in the run of our machine-made musicals. It transmutes the broadly stylized mood of a mettlesome farce into the gusto and colors of the musical stage. ...  Mr. Herman's songs are brisk and pointed and always tuneful ... a shrewdly mischievous performance by Carol Channing. ...  Making the necessary reservations for the unnecessary vulgar and frenzied touches, one is glad to welcome Hello, Dolly! for its warmth, color and high spirits.

John Chapman of the New York Daily News lauded Carol Channing's performance, declaring her "the most outgoing woman on the musical stage today – big and warm, all eyes and smiles, in love with everybody in the theatre and possessing a unique voice ranging somewhat upward from a basso profundo."  He also wrote, "I wouldn't say that Jerry Herman's score is memorable." New York Post critic Richard Watts, Jr., wrote,

The fact that [Hello, Dolly!] seems to me short on charm, warmth, and the intangible quality of distinction in no way alters my conviction that it will be an enormous popular success. Herman has composed a score that is always pleasant and agreeably tuneful, although the only number that comes to mind at the moment is the lively title song. His lyrics could be called serviceable.

In the New York Herald Tribune, Walter Kerr wrote,

Hello, Dolly! is a musical comedy dream, with Carol Channing the girl of it. ... Channing opens wide her big-as-millstone eyes, spreads her white-gloved arms in ecstatic abandon, trots out on a circular runway that surrounds the orchestra, and proceeds to dance rings around the conductor. ... With hair like orange sea foam, a contralto like a horse's neighing, and a confidential swagger, [she is] a musical comedy performer with all the blowzy glamor of the girls on the sheet music of 1916.

Kerr perceived deficiencies in the libretto, though, stating that the "lines are not always as funny as Miss Channing makes them". John McClain of the New York Journal American particularly praised the staging of the musical, saying that

Gower Champion deserves the big gong for performance beyond the call of duty. Seldom has a corps of dancers brought so much style and excitement to a production which could easily have been pedestrian. ... It is difficult to describe the emotion [the song "Hello, Dolly!"] produces. Last night the audience nearly tore up the seats as she led the parade of waiters in a series of encores over the semi-circular runway that extends around the orchestra pit out into the audience, ... a tribute to the personal appeal of Miss Channing and the magical inventiveness of Mr. Champion's staging.

Awards and nominations

Original Broadway production

1978 Broadway revival

1979 West End revival

1995 Broadway revival

2009 Open Air Theatre revival

2017 Broadway revival

Recordings
The RCA Victor cast recording of the original Broadway production was released in 1964. It was the number-one album on the Billboard pop albums chart for seven weeks, the top album of the year on the Year-End chart and won a Grammy Award for Best Musical Theater Album. In 1965, a recording of the original London production was released. In 1967, RCA Victor released a recording of the all-black Broadway replacement cast, featuring Pearl Bailey, who also starred in the unrecorded 1975 revival.

The movie soundtrack was released in 1969. On November 15, 1994, the 1994 revival cast recording was released.

The 2017 Broadway Revival cast recording was released on May 12, 2017, featuring the songs now sung by Bette Midler, David Hyde Pierce, Kate Baldwin, and Gavin Creel.

Cultural influence
In 1964, Armstrong's recording of the song, "Hello, Dolly!", rose to number one on the Billboard pop chart,Ruhlmann, William.  "Song Review" allmusic.com, accessed April 2, 2012 making Armstrong, at age 62, the oldest person ever to accomplish that feat. In the process, Armstrong dislodged The Beatles "Can't Buy Me Love" from the number-one position they had occupied for 14 consecutive weeks with three different songs.
The title song was sung in the 1999 film Dick by actor Dan Hedaya, playing President Richard Nixon.
Multiple songs from the musical were featured prominently in the 2008 film WALL-E
The red satin, sequin-bedecked costume, designed by Freddy Wittop, that Channing wore during Hello, Dolly!'' was donated to the Smithsonian by Channing and theatrical producer Manny Kladitis, following the thirtieth anniversary tour of the show. It has been displayed at the National Museum of American History. While Miss Channing's Harmonia Gardens gown is in the Smithsonian, the remainder of the original Freddy Wittop costumes are now housed in the permanent collection of the Costume World Broadway Collection, a theatrical museum dedicated to Broadway costuming located in Pompano Beach, Florida.

Footnotes

References

 
Bovsun, Mara. From 'Hello, Dolly!': Dolly Gallagher Levi. barbra-archives.com.  Retrieved on 2007-04-08. 

Hello, Dolly! imagi-nation.com.  Retrieved on 2007-04-08.

External links

Internet Broadway Database listing for all productions
Charles Nelson Reilly's autobiographical film, in which he discusses Hello Dolly
"Long Runs on Broadway as of February 2017"
TUTS study guide
Synopsis, Casting, Choreography, Scenes and Settings
1964 New York Times review of original production

1964 musicals
American plays adapted into films
Broadway musicals
Culture of Yonkers, New York
Grammy Hall of Fame Award recipients
Musicals based on plays
Musicals by Jerry Herman
Musicals by Michael Stewart (playwright)
Plays set in New York City
Plays set in the 19th century
Tony Award for Best Musical
West End musicals
A Day Well Spent
Tony Award-winning musicals